Coscinida is a genus of comb-footed spiders that was first described by Eugène Louis Simon in 1895.

Species
 it contains seventeen species, found in Asia, Europe, and Africa:
Coscinida asiatica Zhu & Zhang, 1992 – China
Coscinida conica Yang, Irfan & Peng, 2019 – China
Coscinida coreana Paik, 1995 – Korea
Coscinida decemguttata Miller, 1970 – Congo
Coscinida gentilis Simon, 1895 – Sri Lanka
Coscinida hunanensis Yin, Peng & Bao, 2006 – China
Coscinida japonica Yoshida, 1994 – Japan
Coscinida leviorum Locket, 1968 – Angola
Coscinida lugubris (Tullgren, 1910) – Tanzania
Coscinida novemnotata Simon, 1895 – Sri Lanka
Coscinida proboscidea Simon, 1899 – Indonesia (Sumatra)
Coscinida propinqua Miller, 1970 – Angola
Coscinida shimenensis Yin, Peng & Bao, 2006 – China
Coscinida tibialis Simon, 1895 (type) – Africa, southern Europe, Turkey, Israel, Yemen. Introduced to Thailand
Coscinida triangulifera Simon, 1904 – Sri Lanka, Indonesia (Java)
Coscinida ulleungensis Paik, 1995 – Korea
Coscinida yei Yin & Bao, 2012 – China

Formerly included:
C. subtilis Simon, 1895 (Transferred to Stemmops)

See also
 List of Theridiidae species

References

Araneomorphae genera
Spiders of Africa
Spiders of Asia
Theridiidae